Eupithecia pretoriana is a moth in the family Geometridae. It is found in South Africa.

References

Endemic moths of South Africa
Moths described in 1922
pretoriana
Moths of Africa